Ali Pahlavan (born 1 May 1975) is an Iranian–Australian musician, singer-songwriter, lyricist and composer. He started his professional music career in 1999 by establishing the first Iranian mixed gender pop band, Arian. The band subsequently achieved nationwide success in the 2000s. Arian band has released 6 albums, sold more than 5 million records and performed more than 400 concerts world-wide. Their fifth album, titled Goodbye, was released in March 2015. They announced that this will be their last album. Ali continued with his solo music career.

Personal life

Ali Pahlavan was born on 1 May 1975, thirteen years before his younger brother, in Tehran, Iran. Although Pahlavan's primary instrument was the Daf, a traditional musical instrument from Iran, he decided to continue his musical life with the Guitar. He started learning guitar from Vafa Faraji when he was 17. He studied Industrial Engineering in university and in addition to his music career, works as a project management consultant. Ali immigrated to Australia and became an Australian citizen.

With the Arian band (1998–2015)

Ali and Payam Salehi, the other vocalist of Arian decided to create the first Iranian mixed gender pop band and have a concert together. This decision resulted a concert in Qeshm island one year later in 1998. This concert was the biggest leap for the group, where they met a producer who asked them to create an album, and things went bigger than they expected. Pahlavan and other members of Arian published 6 albums:

 Gol-e-Aftabgardoon (Sunflower) – 2000 – Sold more than 1.7 million official copies in Iran
 Va Amma Eshgh (And but Love... ) – 2001 – Sold more than 2.5 million official copies in Iran
 Taa Binahayat (Till Eternity) – 2003 – Nominated for BBC3 World Music Award
 Bi To Ba To (Without You With You) – 2008 – Featuring Chris de Burgh
 Tak Ahangha – Single Tracks – 2011
 Khodahafez (Goodbye) – 2015

Being on top of the charts in Iran, Arian decided to go beyond the borders and hold concerts worldwide. They traveled to Canada, Europe, USA and some Asian countries and performed a lot of successful concerts world wide. At one point the band sold more than 54,000 tickets for one of their concerts in less than six hours. Touring Europe, they met Chris De Burgh and produced a Persian-English version of his song "The Words I Love You".

Ali also published a book containing the chords and vocals notes of the Arian Band's songs. The book is called: The Arian Band Easy Guitar Songs.

Solo career (2014–present)

Ali moved to Australia and started his career as a solo artist. He has released the following songs:

 Khaterehaye Sooto Koor (Silent Memories)
 Tanhaye Tanha (All Alone)
 Naab (Pure)
 Veg Out (Instrumental)
 With You Without You (featuring Vanessa Steele)
 Khiale To (Your Dream)

Achievements 

 Winner – People's Voice Prize – International Songwriting Competition 2018 – Ali Pahlavan – Song: Naab 
 Honorable Mention – World Music Category –  International Songwriting Competition 2018 – Ali Pahlavan – Song: Naab
 Semi-finalist -Music City SongStar Songwriting competition Fall 2018 – Ali Pahlavan – Song: Naab
 Semi-finalist -Unsigned Only  Songwriting competition 2019 – Ali Pahlavan – Song: Naab
 Semi-finalist -BBC3 Audience Awards – The Arian Band – Album: Till Eternity 
 Certificate of Appreciation – World Food Programme – Ali Pahlavan and the Arian Band – Song: Footsteps of Hope.

References

20th-century Iranian musicians
Living people
1975 births
Iranian singer-songwriters
Musicians from Tehran
Iranian emigrants to Australia